Pisidium dilatatum is a species of freshwater bivalve belonging to the family Sphaeriidae. It is widespread in Europe and Asia, from southern Sweden in the west to Lake Baikal in the east. It occurs in oligotrophic lakes.

References

Sphaeriidae
Molluscs of Asia
Molluscs of Europe
Freshwater animals of Asia
Freshwater animals of Europe
Molluscs described in 1897